Kadal  is a 2013 Indian Tamil-language drama film  co-written, co-produced and directed by Mani Ratnam. The film stars debutantes Gautham Karthik, and Thulasi Nair, with Arjun Sarja, Aravind Swamy and Lakshmi Manchu in supporting roles. The music was composed by A. R. Rahman. The film revolves around life of Christian fishermen who instill the fact that faith can sometimes lead to the triumph of humanity. 

The film was dubbed into Telugu as Kadali. The film was released worldwide on 1 February 2013 to mostly positive reviews, in both the versions. Coincidentally, the leading pair of this movie had their parents- the hero's father Karthik & heroine's mother Radha as established actors, by appearing together in their debut film Alaigal Oivathillai (1981).

Plot 
Bergmans (Arjun), a brilliant but unruly student, is thrown out of his seminary for committing the sin of the flesh after being caught red-handed by fellow student Sam Fernando (Arvind Swamy). Blaming the good-hearted Sam for his ouster, Bergmans vows revenge and challenges to prove that evil does reign supreme in this world. Sam finishes his education and training and arrives at a village as the new Father of the local church. A local boy named Thomas of this village who is the illegitimate son of a local fisherman named Chetty Barnabodas (Ponvannan) has grown up in a rough neighborhood, following his mother's death and thus being forced to fend for himself.

Sam takes the rundown church and skeptical villagers in his stride and starts bringing about changes. Through a series of incidents, he also manages to get the unruly Thomas under his control and gets him to learn the tricks of the fishing trade from the villagers. The film fast forwards a few years when Thomas (Gautham Karthik) is grown up and very close to Sam, who is now a well-respected person in the village. Thomas comes across Beatrice (Thulasi Nair) when she is running away from her convent school group who had gotten her admitted to the hospital. They keep running into each other a few times, and Thomas comes to like her presence.

Meanwhile, as Sam is meditating on the remote beach, he hears a few gunshots on the sands. On investigation, he finds an unconscious Bergmans in the waters. On seeing that the shooters are still lurking around trying to finish their job of killing Bergmans, he pulls him to safety into an abandoned ship and takes care of his bullet injuries with the help of a local village woman as well as a woman named Celina (Lakshmi Manchu) from a distant village that Bergmans asks him to get. A few villagers, including Chetty, who see Sam running around in the dark with the two women, get suspicious and accuse the three of sleeping together. They call the Bishop, upon whose interrogation, Celina admits to the sin, and Sam gets unfairly implicated. One of the villagers is also killed in the ensuing mêlée, and Sam is sentenced to four years of rigorous imprisonment.

Bergmans visits Sam in prison and admits that he got the woman to implicate him falsely, to prove that evil will always triumph. When Sam returns from prison, he discovers that Thomas has fallen in cahoots with Bergmans in his smuggling trade and has committed many sins in his desire to make the village people bow before him. Thomas and Bea have also fallen in love with each other and come to seek Sam's blessings. Thomas subsequently gets to know that Bea is Bergmans's daughter. Thomas takes Bea to Bergmans's house to trigger some long-lost memories when she recalls all the previous horrific incidents of her father, including the one of killing her mother. Bergmans gets angry, abducts Sam and Bea in his boat, and goes out to sea with an intent to kill them. However, even after a few feeble attempts, the self-professed son of Satan who disavows all family attachment is unable to get himself to kill his daughter. Thomas comes chasing them, and after a long drawn-fight amongst the three, he and Sam manage to subdue Bergmans.

The film ends on a note that good finally triumphs over evil, whether it be Sam and Thomas's triumph over Bergmans, Thomas's own suppressing of his bad inclination and rejoining forces with Sam, or Bergmans's good nature coming out in his inability to kill Bea.

Cast 

 Gautham Karthik as Thomas
 Arjun Sarja as Bergmans (Meesakaran)
 Arvind Swamy as Father Sam Fernando
 Thulasi Nair as Beatrice, Bergmans's daughter (voice-over by Krithika Nelson) 
 Lakshmi Manchu as Celina
 Ponvannan as Chetty Barnabodas, Thomas's father
 Singampuli as Clarence
 Kalairani as Mother Superior
 Vinodhini Vaidyanathan as Chandi Mary
 Guru Somasundaram as Kovil Kutty
 Ramdoss as Masilamani
 Anand Verma as Church Father
 Senthi Kumari as Chetty's wife
 Saran Shakthi as Young Thomas
 Baby Rakshana as Young Bea
 Devi as Sahaya Mary, Thomas's mother (cameo appearance)
 Eka Lakhani as Bergmans's wife (uncredited)

Production

Development 
During a press meet in December 2009, actor Karthik revealed that his son, Gautham Karthik would make his debut in Mani Ratnam's next venture post completion of Ratnam's bilingual films Raavan and Raavanan. In July 2010, reports emerged that the film was titled as Pookkadai. Mani Ratnam stopped pre-production work on the film in late 2010 and moved on to plan a big-budget historical project titled Ponniyin Selvan, but months later was forced to shelve it due to financial issues. Later, owing to the speculated title of the former project, the team was unable to name the film Pookkadai as an aspiring director had already registered the name in 2007. Finally the working project was renamed as Kadal in February 2012.
When Mani Ratnam had finished Raavanan (2010), Jeyamohan started writing a 200-page novel for Kadal, which was later transformed by Mani Ratnam into a screenplay. Jeyamohan was signed to be a part of the script-writing team for the film in August 2011, while Rajiv Menon was also confirmed as cinematographer for the film, reuniting with Mani Ratnam after the successes of Bombay and Guru. As the film portrays Christianity, Rajiv Menon explored the way artistes capture biblical themes. For this he and Ratnam went through Simon Schama's documentary called Power of Art on Caravaggio. For the outdoor shootings they stuck to the contemporary way. Mani Ratnam's reconnaissance for the film, the process of designing the look was done when his assistants brought back hundreds of pictures after jaunting through the entire coastline of the state Tamil Nadu, including Rameswaram.

Casting 
Akshara Haasan, daughter of actor Kamal Haasan and actress Sarika were heavily linked to play the female lead role in August 2011 but was not signed. In December 2011, reports emerged that Hindi film actress Sonam Kapoor was signed on to play the role after being convinced by her father but the news was untrue. Jhanvi, daughter of producer Boney Kapoor and actress Sridevi, was also considered to play the role. Finally in January 2012, it was revealed that Samantha was confirmed to portray the lead female role, making film Kadal her most high-profile project till date. After production had begun, Samantha was forced to opt out of the film in June 2012 due to her PMLE ailments. The ace director replaced the lead female by signing Thulasi Nair, the second daughter of actress Radha. Though Thulasi was auditioned for the role during the casting process, she was not selected as Ratnam opined that she was too young for the role. Post Samantha's exit, she was roped in. The child actress in Mani Ratnam's 2002 film Kannathil Muthamittal, Keerthana was approached for a role but she chose to join the film's team as an assistant director, instead.

In November 2011, actor Arjun was signed to play a pivotal role in the film, denying reports that he would play the villain, though this was later revealed to be misdirection. Lakshmi Manchu would be playing a village belle in a negative shade, making her debut in Tamil films. Actors Pasupathy and Lal were opted for supporting roles in the film, but Lal dropped the film due to his commitments to Malayalam film Ozhimuri. Arvind Swamy who returned to films post twelve years, was signed to play a full-fledged role. Thambi Ramiah was also confirmed to be a part of the cast. Child artiste Saran, earlier seen in films such as Mudhal Idam and Mye, would be seen playing Gautham Karthik's childhood role. Theater artiste Devi would be playing the role actor Gautham's mother. Baby Rakshana would be playing the role of childhood Thulasi. Mani Ratnam roped in Nayantara for a special role in the film which was confirmed in early July 2012. However, the actress opted out claiming unavailability of dates and meager scope of her character in the film. Malayalam comedian Baiju was selected to play a supporting role.

Filming 

Keeping principal photography under wraps, the director made the leading duo to undertake a 20-day acting workshop that was conducted by his crew. Later, a two-month acting workshop under the mentorship of actress Kalairani was also attended by them. The shooting of the film started on 1 March 2012 at Manapad, a sea village in Thoothukudi district. Scenes involving Arvind Swamy and Lakshmi Manchu were shot first. In March 2012, in a schedule of five days, certain scenes were shot at Kottayam, Muhamma, backwaters and forts of Kochi in Kerala. The filming continued in Kerala throughout April 2012. A scene featuring the lead actors was shot at a church, created as a set in Tuticorin. Scenes were also canned in longest Indian lake Vembanad, Alappuzha. In the scenic interiors of Andaman & Nicobar Islands, twenty days filming schedule was completed by end of July 2012. In an interview with Times of India in October 2012, Suhasini Mani Ratnam revealed that filming was in its final stages. On 31 October 2012, the crew shot the climax of the film in coastal suburbs of Chennai under the weather contrived by Cyclone Nilam. On 5 November 2012, the shooting of the film was completed except for a song to be canned in Alappuzha. This song schedule and patchwork for the film kicked off on 13 January 2013. By second last week of the same month the patch work and re-recording of the background score was completed. Post release of theatrical trailer, it was revealed that the filming of ten second osculating scene between lead actors took four hours to complete after several re-takes. The director had devoided the technicians and crew from the location to ease the situation for the actors. Post filming completions, the cinematographer stated that the film was set in a hard landscape. For initial portions of the film the crew created the barren look by emphasising sand colours and muffling vibrancy of costumes. Apparently, this was achieved to create an hostile environment in which the lead male character grows. Writer Jeyamohan told The Hindu, that the script was "deeply philosophical and spiritual", "but it has been narrated in an entertaining way, complete with songs and captivating frames. It is a grand saga..", he added.

Music 

Director Mani Ratnam's usual associate music composer, A. R. Rahman composed the songs as well as the background score for the film. The lyrics of three songs were penned by Vairamuthu, other three by his son Madhan Karky and remaining one by rapper Aaryan Dinesh Kanagaratnam, making the album feature seven tracks in the soundtrack album. The original Tamil version of the album was released on 28 November 2012, by the record label Sony Music. It topped the Indian music charts, especially iTunes India. The Telugu version of the soundtrack album was released direct to stores on 19 December 2012 and was also launched in a grand event at H.I.C.C. Novotel, Hyderabad on 2 January 2013.

Release 
Gemini Film Circuit bought the theatrical rights of the film for  250 million. The film was given a U certificate by the Censor Board after five minor cuts. The advanced booking opened two days prior to the release. However, the distributors in Tamil Nadu faced arduousness for screen occupancies due to controversial release status of film Vishwaroopam.

ATMUS Entertainment secured the distribution rights of the film in USA. The original (Tamil) version was released in 54 screens and dubbed (Telugu) version in 20 screens. The film was premiered in most of the locations of the same country a day prior to the actual release.

Marketing 
In February 2012, after the official announcement of the project with title several forged posters were released over the internet citing wrong credits and the film plot. On 19 November 2012 the film's official page was launched on social networking website Facebook. After two days the poster of the male lead concealing his visage was released through the same. In order to guard the facial identities of the debutantes, Mani Ratnam requested their respective parents to not let Thulasi or Gautham Karthik be snapped by anyone. Additionally they had to refrain from public appearances. The actress refused to appear at an interview for the same reason. The main theatrical trailer was released on 11 January 2013 through Madras Talkies' YouTube channel. The trailer was also attached to the theatre prints of film Alex Pandian that released on the same day. In a frenzy, the trailer crossed 1 million views within a day of its release on YouTube.

Home media 
The satellite rights of the film were sold to STAR Vijay.

Reception

Critical response 
Kadal received mixed reviews from critics. At DNA India, critic Mahalakshmi Prabhakaran quoted, "A poignant film", further adding, "The only drawback of the movie might be the fact that it drags towards the end. Else, go and watch Kadal. It is a beautifully made film.". On the contrary, Indiaglitz stated, "Too obvious to be an entertainer, too downplayed to be a classic" and added (that the film was) "overly commercial and no real Mani Ratnam effect". However, the Telugu version was reviewed contrary by the same source stating, "With a beautiful story and an imaginative screenplay, Kadal is a breathtaking film topped with fine performances which convey a range of emotions; the film weaves a number of immensely watchable scenes." Radhika Rajamani of Rediff quoted, "Kadal has all the elements of a regular entertainer but has nothing new in terms of a story" thereby summarising, "Kadal has nothing new to offer". Shekhar of OneIndia said, "Kadali is a beautiful romance drama with some commercial ingredients like action and punch dialogues." T.S. Sudhir at Firstpost stated, "Mani Ratnam's Kadal leaves viewers at sea". Nandini Ramnath at Livemint noted, "Kadal is not a perfect storm, but it's far from a sinking proposition. It floats comfortably midstream, coasting along on the strength of attractive actors and visuals." However, she added more by stating, "A predictable story layered with strong performances" At Deccan Chronicle, Khalid Mohamed wrote, "Well, Mani still matters".

Simon Foster of Special Broadcasting Service noted: "Though lovingly cinematic in parts, it’s a dramatically shallow exploration of exploitable themes; a visual feast that will leave audiences intellectually under-nourished." M. Suganth of The Times of India noted, "Kadal's flaws are even more glaring. It is a failure for Mani Ratnam the storyteller, saved only to a certain extent by his visual flair." The critical review board at Behindwoods quoted, "Technically brilliant, but wanting in Mani Ratnam's magic". Sify reviewed, "Straight off the bat, Mani Ratnam's Kadal is nowhere in the league of his earlier films." However, applauded other aspects stating, "Rajiv Menon's striking camerawork, AR Rahman's music is one of the major plus of the film". Sahara Samay attributed the film title stating, "Confusion lasts like a sea. At the end the, movies seems like a tussle between fishing net and church." However, they added, "The music by A.R. Rahman is good and cinematography is at its best." Sangeetha Devi Dundoo of The Hindu who reviewed the Telugu version said, "Kadali is a visual and musical treat but content wise, the sailing isn't smooth." Vivek Ramz of In noted, "Kadal is a tiring watch and recommended only for die-hard Mani Ratnam fans."

Box office 
The film began receding occupancy post 20 days of its release and was declared as disaster by Box Office India.

Domestic

The film had a poor opening in Chennai. During the weekend of release, the number of shows in Chennai were 303 where as the average theatre occupancy was 60% and the filmed grossed . However, certain section of media reported incorrect box office collection leading to contradiction to the actual verdicts.

International

In the US the film grossed  on the opening day. In UK and Ireland box office, the film collected £1,189 on 4 screens, with the per screen average working out to £297 summing up to £35,737.

Awards and nominations 
Positive nominations and awards' ceremonies held during 2013–14.

Controversies 
After the release of first trailer of the film, the kissing scene between the leading debutantes was brought into discussions by media and audience. Later, Ratnam clarified that the scene has its own importance, justified in the story line of the film. Thulasi Nair in 2012 was fifteen years of age and scenes portraying such with minors, this fact added more to the same controversy. However, actress Radha, mother of Thulasi, defended stating "As I did Bharathiraja's film Alaigal Oivathillai, I was aged sixteen. There is a unique style and limitations directors have. They give proper directions to artistes. There is no mistake in doing intimate scenes if it is required for the movie." To avoid further repercussions, the osculating scene was chopped off the theatrical prints of the film thereby reducing the running length of the film to 150 minutes.

On 5 February 2013, Indian Christian Democratic Party put allegations that Kadal had objectionable scenes referring to Christianity. They claimed that the film depicted their community in a cloddish manner. The members of the party proposed the deletion those scenes and warned of intensifying their protests. A memorandum in this regard was also submitted by them to police on the same day.

The film distributors suffered financial losses due to performance of the film at the box office and hence, on 9 February 2013, around fifty members, who had taken the theatrical rights of the film for various regions, protested in front of Madras Talkies' office and demanded the compensation. Defending the situation the production house claimed, "Madras Talkies had sold their film 'Kadal' (both Tamil and dubbed Telugu version) to Gemini Industries and Imaging Ltd in March 2012 itself on MG (Minimum Guarantee) basis" They added, "Madras Talkies has had no other dealing with anyone else for the distribution of their film, nor has been party to any contracts Gemini might have entered into in this regard".

Lingusamy's own production company Thirupathi Brothers had purchased the distribution rights of Mani Ratnam's Kadal for Chennai, Madurai and Coimbatore prior to the release of the movie. To the controversies over film, in a press release dated 2 March 2013, the distributor, on a positive note stated that he would never demand compensation for the losses incurred over acquiring Kadal'''s distribution rights. He assured that neither he nor anyone from his office would press Mani Ratnam for compensation of monetary losses incurred over Kadal'' at any point of time.

As per the proceedings of Madras High Court it was learnt that Mannan, one of the distributors for the film and his men issued false statements to let down the reputations of the director. With no basis and intentions to extort money from his clients, the distributor and some miscreants trespassed into Ratnam's office and abused the staff. On 14 March 2013, the judge was passed interim orders on an application arising out of a civil suit from the director and his wife. The suit claimed for a direction to Mannan to pay  50 million towards the damages.

See also 
 List of films directed by Mani Ratnam featuring A. R. Rahman

References

External links 
 
 
 

2013 films
Indian drama films
Films directed by Mani Ratnam
Films shot in Tamil Nadu
2010s Tamil-language films
Films scored by A. R. Rahman
Films shot in Alappuzha
Films shot in Kochi
Filicide in fiction
Films about father–daughter relationships